Zinc finger protein 730 is a protein that in humans is encoded by the ZNF730 gene.

References

Further reading